Gateway Regional High School (GRHS), commonly referred to as "Gateway" or "Gateway Regional," is a high-performing and well-regarded public high school located in Huntington, Massachusetts, United States. It is the only high school in the Gateway Regional School District, serving students from Blandford, Chester, Huntington, Middlefield, Montgomery, Russell, and Worthington.

History

It is said that before the abolition of slavery, a branch of the Underground Railroad, which was developed to assist fugitive slaves in their escape to Canada, ran through Huntington (then Murrayfield). Millers' Tavern operated as a "station," and, being the last "hiding place" en route, became known as "The Gateway."

Today, the High School, Junior High School, Middle School, and Littleville Elementary stand on the old Moore farm property, the house and barns of which once served as Millers' Tavern and Stage Coach Inn. Therefore, it was natural to take the suggestion for a name for the school and district from the history and heritage of the past, so this parcel of land could continue to be a gateway to a better future.

Academics
Gateway has a history of pursuing the same high standards as New England's elite prep schools while still maintaining the egalitarian principles of a public school. Academically, the school regularly outperforms other public schools in Western Massachusetts, particularly as measured by the yearly MCAS assessment required of all Massachusetts public schools.

Extracurricular activities

Model United Nations 
Founded in the Fall of 2013, Gateway Regional High School-Model United Nations (GRHS—MUN) is advised by History Department teacher Nicholas Vooys. The club attends several Model UN conferences each year, including Boston College's EagleMUNC.
The club's constitution, ratified on November 6, 2013, was amended on June 4, 2014. This revision was significant as it included an overhaul of the club's executive structure and powers.

The Model United Nations club hosts two MUN conferences each year. noviceMUN, which is intended for beginner delegates, is held each Fall and GRMUNC, which is the club's flagship conference, is held each spring. noviceMUN, followed by GRMUNC, was the first Model UN conference in Western Massachusetts to be hosted by a high school.

As Schools Match Wits 
The As Schools Match Wits team (ASMW) practices trivia questions after school in preparation for competition in As Schools Match Wits, a high school quiz show that airs on WGBY.

Gateway Education, News and Entertainment System (Genesys) 
Genesys produces periodic news videos which are posted on YouTube. All of the broadcasters are students, as are all of the crew. Genesys also appears at most school events, filming and archiving all of their footage.

BRM5 Club 
The BRM5 club is a video gaming club where students play a popular video game called Blackhawk Rescue Mission 5 where students go to El Chara to grind civilians into cash, formed in 2019.

Thespian Club 
Gateway's Thespian Club produces one play every academic year. The play is held in the spring and past performances have included Shakespeare's Much Ado About Nothing, among other plays.

Red Cross Club 
The Red Cross Club, formed in 2014, partakes in volunteer service.

Student Government
The Student Council at Gateway consists of sixteen Student Representatives, four from each grade. The Student Council holds annual elections.

Athletics
Gateway's teams are known as the Gateway Gators; their colors are blue and gold. The school is especially well known for its soccer teams (both the boys' and girls' teams), though also excels at other sports, including baseball.

Sports offered include:

Fall
Boys' Soccer (JV, Varsity)
Girls' Soccer (JV, Varsity)
Boys' and Girls' Cross Country
Winter
Boys' Basketball (JV, Varsity)
Girls' Basketball (JV, Varsity)
Alpine Skiing
Wrestling
Cheerleading
Ice Hockey (Co-op with Southwick Regional)

Spring
Baseball (JV, Varsity)
Softball (JV, Varsity)

Traditions

Reindeer Games
The Reindeer Games are a yearly tradition at Gateway. Held by the Student Council in the High School gym, students compete in various activities and other games to earn spirit points for their respective classes.

Junior Prom
Every year, the junior class organizes a prom, which is attended by both juniors and seniors. It is usually held at another location.

Spring Fling
Hosted by the Student Council, Spring Fling brings students outside to enjoy the end of the school year.

Graduation

Notable alumni
 Wayne Granger, Major League Baseball player

See also

Education in Massachusetts

References

External links

 District website
 2013-2014 Student Handbook (PDF)
 GRHS profile on www.greatschools.org
 GRHS news on Masslive.com
 Mass 1to1 laptop initiative
 Video of Gateway's Academic Quiz Club competing in As Schools Match Wits
 Collection of videos from Genesys, formerly Gateway News Network

Schools in Hampshire County, Massachusetts
Public high schools in Massachusetts
1963 establishments in Massachusetts